Chad Baxter (born 23 February 1983) is a South African cricketer. He played 36 first-class and 34 List A matches between 2002 and 2010. He was also part of South Africa's squad for the 2002 Under-19 Cricket World Cup.

References

External links
 

1983 births
Living people
South African cricketers
Boland cricketers
Eastern Province cricketers
Cricketers from East London, Eastern Cape